Judith Hauser (born 23 September 1992) is a German group rhythmic gymnast. 

She represents her nation at international competitions. She participated at the 2012 Summer Olympics in London. 
She also competed at world championships, including at the 2009, 2010, 2011, 2013, and 2014 World Rhythmic Gymnastics Championships.

References

External links

YouTube

1992 births
Living people
German rhythmic gymnasts
Place of birth missing (living people)
Gymnasts at the 2012 Summer Olympics
Olympic gymnasts of Germany